Making the Heavens Speak: Religion as Poetry is a 2020 book by the German philosopher Peter Sloterdijk.

Summary
The book analyzes religions from a perspective where they are viewed as literary products. Rejecting anti-religious positions such as that of Karl Marx, it examines the genre's stylistic devices, or "theopoetics". Among the subjects it covers are the theatre of ancient Greece, the anti-mythological stance of Plato, ancient Egyptian polytheism, the theologian Karl Barth, Heinrich Joseph Dominicus Denzinger's Enchiridion Symbolorum, the universal claims of Islam, and the Book of Job.

Publication
Suhrkamp Verlag published the book in Germany on 26 October 2020. An English translation by Robert Hughes is set to be published by Polity in November 2022.

Reception
Stephan Sattler of Focus placed the book in a group of recent German books about the origins and history of "human understanding of the self and the world", written by Hans Joas, Jan Assmann and Jürgen Habermas, which all draw from the latest decades of philological, historical and sociological research. Sattler wrote that each of Sloterdijk's chapters can be read as a standalone essay, and that "this disturbing book should not be missed".

References

Citations

Sources

 
 
 
 

2020 non-fiction books
German non-fiction books
Books about religion
Books of literary criticism
Books by Peter Sloterdijk
Suhrkamp Verlag books
Polity (publisher) books